Kristin Stewart Luckenbill (born May 28, 1979) is an American professional soccer goalkeeper and Olympic gold medalist. She previously played for the Boston Breakers and Sky Blue FC of Women's Professional Soccer as well as the Carolina Courage of the WUSA. She is a former member of the United States women's national soccer team.

Early life
Born in Paoli, Pennsylvania and attended Conestoga High School and Stratton Mountain School in Vermont. During her final year of high school she was named All-Conference, All-County, All-Region, All-State, Regional All-American and High School All-American. She was also named Pennsylvania High School Player of the Year.

Dartmouth College
Luckenbill attended Dartmouth College from 1997 to 2000, where she was a three-time NCAA All-American, four-time First Team All-Ivy League, Ivy League Rookie of the Year and Ivy League Player of the year. She helped lead Dartmouth to two Ivy League Championships and four straight NCAA Tournaments including an Elite Eight appearance in 1998. Luckenbill recorded a Dartmouth-record 29 career shutouts and is ranked second in career goals against average at 0.73.

Playing career

Club

Carolina Courage
Luckenbill was drafted to play for the Carolina Courage in the WUSA in 2001.  She was the starting goalkeeper for the Courage for most of her tenure, winning the Founders Cup Championship in 2002, earning WUSA Goalkeeper of the Year and First-Team All-League honors and starting in the WUSA All-Star Game.  She was also nominated for an ESPY Award in 2003 for "Best Female Soccer Player".

Her professional career spanned until 2010, playing for Jitex (Sweden), the Vermont Voltage, FC Indiana, the Boston Breakers, and Sky Blue FC.

International
Luckenbill became a member of the United States women's national soccer team in 2004, and won an Olympic gold medal with the team in Athens.  She finished her professional soccer career in the WPS, playing one season for the Boston Breakers and the following season for Sky Blue FC.

International career statistics

Personal life
Luckenbill graduated from Dartmouth College in 2001 with a Bachelor of Arts in geography. She announced her retirement from professional soccer after July 2010, to pursue a master's degree in business from the Darden School of Business at the University of Virginia. She graduated from Virginia with a Master of Business Administration in 2012.

Luckenbill now works as a management consultant at Heidrick & Struggles.

References

External links
 
 US Soccer player profile
 Boston Breakers player profile
 W-League player profile
 Carolina Courage player profile
 

1979 births
Living people
American women's soccer players
Footballers at the 2004 Summer Olympics
Olympic gold medalists for the United States in soccer
United States women's international soccer players
Women's United Soccer Association players
Carolina Courage players
Boston Breakers players
Dartmouth Big Green women's soccer players
NJ/NY Gotham FC players
Women's association football goalkeepers
People from Paoli, Pennsylvania
Medalists at the 2004 Summer Olympics
F.C. Indiana players
Damallsvenskan players
American expatriate sportspeople in Sweden
Expatriate women's footballers in Sweden
American expatriate women's soccer players
Women's Professional Soccer players